Leszek Jabłonowski (born 11 January 1954) is a Polish fencer. He competed in the individual and team sabre events at the 1976 and 1980 Summer Olympics.

References

1954 births
Living people
Polish male fencers
Olympic fencers of Poland
Fencers at the 1976 Summer Olympics
Fencers at the 1980 Summer Olympics
Sportspeople from Kraków